A constitutional referendum was held in French Somaliland on 13 October 1946 as part of the wider French constitutional referendum. Although the proposed new constitution was rejected by 73% of voters in the territory, it was approved 53% of voters overall.

Results

References

1946 referendums
Referendums in Djibouti
1946 in French Somaliland
Constitutional referendums in France
October 1946 events in Africa